Berlin-Pankow is a station on the Berlin–Szczecin railway, situated in Berlin's Pankow district.

Overview

Pankow is a station on Berlin S-Bahn and Berlin U-Bahn networks. The station is served by the following services:

Berlin S-Bahn
The station opened on 15 October 1880, south of the former Pankow village. It soon was named Pankow-Schönhausen after the neighbouring Schönhausen Palace. The entrance building was rebuilt in 1911 with the establishment of the suburban railway toward Bernau, which would become the first line of the Berlin S-Bahn on 8 August 1924. The station was renamed Berlin-Pankow in 1954.

With the construction of the marshalling yard Pankow the passenger station was likewise converted received in the course of the work a platform "after kind of the citizens of Berlin light rail stations". Until 1916, the suburban traffic was separated from the long-distance and freight traffic on the Szczecin railway to Bernau. The new track pair for long-distance and freight traffic went into operation between the previous line and the marshalling yard and was structurally taken into account in its construction. In the course of the expansion, a new reception building was built from 1909 to 1914 to plans by Karl Cornelius and Ernst Schwartz on the north side. A good ten years later, electrical operation was tested on the entire suburban line. Based on the electrification decision in 1913, the German Reichsbahn intended until 1922 still a trolleybus operation and 15 kilovolt 162/3 Hertz AC voltage. Between Pankow and Pankow-Heinersdorf at the beginning of 1921, twelve masts were set up at a distance of around 100 meters. The Reichsbahn decided, however, for the still common today with the Berlin S-Bahn operation with lateral busbar. The transformer plant was erected in Pankow for the power supply. On 8 August 1924, the electrical control mode was recorded.

It was supposed to be a regional railway station but plans were scrapped.

These are the railway lines that pass through Pankow station:

 S2 (Bernau - Karow - Pankow - Gesundbrunnen - Friedrichstraße - Südkreuz - Blankenfelde)
 S8 (Birkenwerder - Blankenburg - Pankow - Ostkreuz - Schöneweide - Grünau)
 S85 (Pankow - Ostkreuz - Schöneweide - Grünau)

Berlin U-Bahn
Since 1930, when the northern terminus of the U2 U-Bahn line was extended to nearby Pankow (Vinetastraße), an extension towards the Berlin Pankow station had been planned, but no work was carried out. In October 1997, the "underground station Pankow" was renamed to Vinetastraße. The new terminus was opened on 16 September 2000. The next extension(s) possible after the Pankow will be Pankow Kirche, Ossietzkyplatz and Rosenthaler Weg; these plans have all been considered since June 2003.

The possibility of extending the line to Niederschönhausen was first considered in 1957, and was kept on the drawing board when Berlin was divided into East Berlin and West Berlin, in 1961. The city of Berlin had given the green light to build Pankow station only that is connected to the Berlin S-Bahn on 7 November 1987.

References

U2 (Berlin U-Bahn) stations
Pankow
Pankow
Railway stations in Germany opened in 1880